Nissaga de poder (English: Lineage of power) was a Catalan TV soap opera which was broadcast on TV3 from 1996 to 1998. It became one of TV3's most popular TV series. It was created by Josep Maria Benet i Jornet and adapted to TV by Jordi Arcarazo.

Plot
Eulàlia and Mateu Montsolís are siblings who own a winery located in the region of Penedès, 
Cavas Montsolís. They are members of one of the richest families in the region.

The plot revolves around the incestuous love between Eulàlia and Mateu, which gave birth to a son, Eduard. But the Montsolís family cannot allow this to become public as the scandal would cause irreversible damage. Their official story is that Eduard is the illegitimate child of a sporadic relationship between Mateu Montsolís and one of his many lovers, Àngels Estivill. Eduard was raised by family employees Tomas and Assumpció.

The deceptions, murders, betrayals, envy and turbulent relationships between members of a powerful family in the midst of a stifling atmosphere are the plot of the series.

Cast

Sequel
On May 12, 1999, TV3 premiered a sequel called Nissaga: L'herència as a weekly series. The plot occurs 16 years after the final of the original series and is based around the following generation of the Montsolís. However, the series received poor reviews and ended on January 19, 2000, with only 26 episodes.

References

Catalan television programmes
1996 Spanish television series debuts
1998 Spanish television series endings
Television shows set in Catalonia
1990s Spanish drama television series